Live In Praha is a live DVD by the Slovak punk rock band Iné Kafe, recorded on 31 January 2009 at Incheba Aréna in Prague and released on 20 April 2009.

Track listing

Info
Picture: 4:3, 16:9
Sound: 2.0
Subtitles: none
Format: PAL

Personnel
 Vratko Rohoň - vocals, guitar
 Mario "Wayo" Praženec - guitar
 Peter "Forus" Fóra - bass, backing vocals
 Jozef "Dodo" Praženec – drums
 Peter Preložník (guest) - piano (13, 14)

References

2009 live albums
Iné Kafe albums